Protease, serine, 3 is a protein that in humans is encoded by the PRSS3 gene.

Function 

This gene encodes a trypsinogen, which is a member of the trypsin family of serine proteases. This enzyme is expressed in the brain and pancreas and is resistant to common trypsin inhibitors. It is active on peptide linkages involving the carboxyl group of lysine or arginine. This gene is localized to the locus of T cell receptor beta variable orphans on chromosome 9. Four transcript variants encoding different isoforms have been described for this gene.

References

Further reading